Events from the year 1883 in Russia.

Incumbents
 Monarch – Alexander III

Events

 
 
  
 
 Cathedral of Christ the Saviour
 Emancipation of Labour
 Hugo Treffner Gymnasium
 Moscow Society of Stamp Collectors

Births
 10 January - Aleksei Nikolaevich Tolstoy, Russian writer (d. 1945)
 3 April - Nikolai Kuzmin, Soviet political and military leader (d. 1938)
 25 April - Semyon Budyonny, Cossack cavalryman, Marshal of the Soviet Union (d. 1973)
 18 July - Lev Kamenev, Russian revolutionary (d. 1936)
 19 August - Leonid Kulik, Russian mineralogist (d. 1942)
 14 November - Ado Birk, 3rd Prime Minister of Estonia (d. 1942)
 29 November - Lev Galler, Soviet admiral (d. 1950)
 16 December - Vasili Altfater, Russian and Soviet admiral (d. 1919)
 Ivan Bardin, Soviet metallurgist

Deaths

 Pyotr Pavlovich Albedinsky

References

1883 in Russia
Years of the 19th century in the Russian Empire